A summit is the highest point of a mountain, hill, road, or railway.

Summit may also refer to:

Places
 Summit, Alabama, an unincorporated community
 Summit, Arizona, a census-designated place
 Summit, Arkansas, a city
 Summit, California (disambiguation)
 Summit Bridge, Delaware, an unincorporated community also called Summit
 Summit, Illinois, a village
 Summit, DeKalb County, Indiana, an unincorporated community
 Summit, Greene County, Indiana, an unincorporated community
 Summit, Hendricks County, Indiana, an unincorporated community
 Summit, LaPorte County, Indiana, an unincorporated community
 Summit, Tippecanoe County, Indiana, an unincorporated community
 Summit, Kentucky, an unincorporated community
 Summit, Mississippi, a town
 Summit, Missouri, an unincorporated community
 Summit, New Jersey, a city
 Summit, New York, a town
 Summit, Oklahoma, a town
 Summit, Oregon, an unincorporated community
 Summit, Rhode Island, a village
 Summit, South Carolina, a town
 Summit, South Dakota, a town
 Summit, Utah, a census-designated place
 Summit, Washington, a census-designated place
 Summit, West Virginia, an unincorporated community
 Summit, Wisconsin (disambiguation)
 Summit Camp, a research station on the Greenland Ice Sheet
 Summit City (disambiguation)
 Summit County (disambiguation)
 Lake Summit, Winter Haven, Florida
 Summit Lake (disambiguation)
 Summit Lakes (disambiguation)
 Summit Mountain (disambiguation)
 Summit Pass (British Columbia), a mountain pass in British Columbia, Canada
 Summit Peak, Colorado
 Mount Ina Coolbrith, California, formerly Summit Peak
 Summit Range, a mountain range in California
 Summit Ridge, Graham Land, Antarctica
 Summit, L'Anse Township, Michigan, an unincorporated community
 Summit, Washtenaw County, Michigan, a historic community

 Summit Township (disambiguation)
 Hope, Providence, Rhode Island or Summit, a neighborhood

Buildings
 Summit (Catonsville, Maryland), an historic home on the National Register of Historic Places
 Summit Playhouse, a theater in Summit, New Jersey; on the National Register of Historic Places
 Summit Square or Summit Bank Building, the tallest office building in Fort Wayne, Indiana

Arts and entertainment

Games and puzzles
 Summit (game), a board game based on the Cold War
 Summit (puzzle), a word puzzle and scoring system; see Showdown (game)

Music
 Summit (groups), a type of collaboration in jazz music
 Summit Records, an American record label
 Summit (album), a 1974 album by Astor Piazzolla and Gerry Mulligan
 Summit, a 2010 album by American band Thou
 "Summit" (song), a 2007 song by Josh Gabriel
 "Summit", a 2013 song by Skrillex featuring Ellie Goulding from Bangarang

Television
 "Summit" (The Outer Limits), a 1999 television episode
 "Summit" (Stargate SG-1), a 2001 television episode

Business
 Summit Air, an air charter airline serving northern Canada
 Summit Aerosports, American producer of the powered parachute Summit 2
 Summit Bank, based in Pakistan
 Summit Brewing Company, a craft brewery in Saint Paul, Minnesota, US
 Summit Business Media, a business-to-business media and information company
 Summit Communications Group, Atlanta, Georgia, US
 Summit Cookie Bars, a candy bar that is no longer produced
 Summit Credit Union, Madison, Wisconsin, US
 Summit Entertainment, a movie production company
 Summit Group, a large Bangladeshi conglomerate
 Summit Mall, Fairlawn, Ohio, US
 Summit Media, a magazine publishing company in the Philippines
 Summit Racing Equipment, a mail order automotive performance equipment company
 Summit Systems, a financial software editor, now part of the Misys group

Plants
 Summit, a variety of hop
 Summit, a muscadine (Vitis rotundifolia) cultivar

Schools
 Summit University, formerly known as Baptist Bible College & Seminary, in Clarks Summit, Pennsylvania, US
 Summit High School (disambiguation)
 Summit Middle School (disambiguation)
 Summit School (disambiguation)

Sports
 Summit Arena, an indoor arena in Hot Springs, Arkansas
 Summit League, a U.S. college athletic conference
 Summit Motorsports Park, a drag racing facility near Norwalk, Ohio
 Summit Ski Area, Mount Hood, Oregon

Transportation-related
 AJW Summit, a British high specification motorcycle made by AJW Motorcycles between 1927 and 1931
 Eagle Summit, a subcompact automobile sold by the Chrysler Corporation
 Summit Airport (Alaska), Summit, Alaska
 Summit Airport (Delaware), Middletown, Delaware
 Summit Avenue (disambiguation)
 Summit Bridge, connecting Newark and Dover, Delaware
 Summit rail station (disambiguation), several rail stations
 Summit Tunnel, West Yorkshire, England

Other uses
 Summit (meeting), a meeting of heads of state or government
 Summit (supercomputer), a TOP500 supercomputer developed by IBM
 USS Summit (AMc-106), a US Navy coastal minesweeper
 Summit Awards, for advertising
 Summit Ministries, an evangelical Christian organization
 SUMMIT, biennial technical festival conducted by the College of Engineering Chengannur, India
 Summit, an interlibrary loan service offered by the Orbis Cascade Alliance

See also
 The Summit (disambiguation)
 Summit Series (disambiguation), competitions between Soviet and Canadian professional ice hockey players
 
 
 summit1g, American internet personality Jaryd Russell Lazar